Luperina is a genus of moths of the family Noctuidae.

Species

 Luperina dayensis Oberthür, 1891
 Luperina diversa (Staudinger, 1891)
 Luperina dumerilii (Duponchel, 1826)
 Luperina farsiensis Fibiger & Zahiri, 2005
 Luperina grzimeki Hacker, 1989
 Luperina imbellis (Staudinger, 1888)
 Luperina jelskii (Oberthür, 1908)
 Luperina kaszabi Boursin, 1967
 Luperina kravchenkoi Fibiger & Müller, 2005
 Luperina kruegeri Turati, 1912
 Luperina lacunosa Kozhantschikov, 1925
 Luperina madeirae Fibiger, 2005
 Luperina nickerlii – Sandhill Rustic (Freyer, 1845)
 Luperina powelli Culot, 1912
 Luperina pseudoderthisa Rothschild, 1914
 Luperina rjabovi (Klyuchko, 1967)
 Luperina rubella (Duponchel, [1838])
 Luperina samnii (Sohn-Rethel, 1929)
 Luperina siegeli Berio, 1986
 Luperina taurica (Klyuchko, 1967)
 Luperina testacea – Flounced Rustic (Denis & Schiffermüller, 1775)
 Luperina tiberina (Sohn-Rethel, 1929)

Former species
 Luperina enargia is now Resapamea enargia (Barnes & Benjamin, 1926)
 Luperina innota is now Resapamea innota (Smith, 1908)
 Luperina passer is now Resapamea passer (Guenée, 1852)
 Luperina stipata is now Resapamea stipata (Morrison, 1875)
 Luperina trigona is now Resapamea trigona (Smith, 1902)
 Luperina venosa is now Resapamea venosa (Smith, 1903)

References
 Luperina at funet.fi
 Natural History Museum Lepidoptera genus database

 
Apameini
Taxa named by Jean Baptiste Boisduval